Bombom may refer to:

 Bombom, São Tomé and Príncipe, village located in the Príncipe island
 Adriana Bombom (born 1974), Brazilian entertainer
 Comic BomBom, a Japanese manga magazine
 "BomBom", by Macklemore
 "Bom Bom", Sam and the Womp song